James Christopher Mair (born May 22, 1966) is a soprano, alto, tenor, baritone saxophonist, flautist, percussionist, pianist, singer, band leader, teacher and entrepreneur.

Biography
Jim was raised in Winnipeg, Manitoba and graduated from Silver Heights Collegiate in 1984. That same year his quintet won top high school combo in Canada and he was selected lead tenor in the Canadian High School All Star Jazz Ensemble. His school band directors were Wilfred Jones and Jim Mackay. In June 1986, he was profiled in Down Beat magazine as a young musician deserving of wider recognition.

Mair graduated from the University of Mary (Bismarck, North Dakota) with a Bachelor of Science degree in Music Education (1988) and the University of Missouri at Kansas City Conservatory of Music and Dance with a Master of Arts degree in music (1990).  He studied with Scott Prebys and Loran Eckroth at U-Mary from 1984 to 1988, Mike Parkinson Gary Foster and Tim Timmons at UMKC from 1988 to 1990 and did additional studies at the Banff Summer Jazz Workshop with Dave Holland. Kenny Wheeler and Pat Labarbera in 1988. He is a two-time full fellowship recipient at the Aspen Music Festival in 1989 and 1990.
  
Jim is a professor of Music and Director of Instrumental Music and Jazz Studies at Kansas City Kansas Community College. In December 2014, his college big band performed at the 30th annual Havana Jazz Festival in Cuba. He also serves as the Artistic Director/founder of The Kansas City Jazz Alliance (501c3), The Kansas City High School and Middle School Jazz All Stars program and is the producer of The Kansas City Jazz Summit which includes the annual Basically Basie Competition. From 2003 to 2010 he served as the artistic director and conductor for The Kansas City Jazz Orchestra (501c3), a performance organization that he and his wife Mary founded. Jim is also one of the co-founders of the Prairie Village Jazz Festival.

Mair has also served on the faculty at the College of Southern Idaho, the International Music Camp, and the Charlie Parker Academy of the Arts. In addition, he has served as a staff writer for the Saxophone Journal and since 1992 has served as an artist/clinician for the Selmer Instrument Company. Mair has conducted the North Dakota, South Dakota (twice) and Idaho All-State Jazz Ensembles (twice) and the Kansas City All District Jazz Band (six times). While teaching in Idaho from 1995 to 1999 his radio show "Table Down Front" was broadcast across the northwest on NPR affiliates. His performance credits include appearances at the Havana, Cuba Jazz Festival, New York City JVC Jazz Festival, Montreux Jazz Festival, IAJE Convention, JEN Convention, Carnegie Recital Hall, Birdland and Showman's Cafe in New York City and the Duchin Room in Sun Valley, Idaho.

In 1999, Mair was honored by the Governor of Idaho for his outstanding contributions to the Arts. He received the same recognition from the state of Kansas in 2010. In the spring of 2013 Mair received the Henry Louis Teaching Excellence Award from KCKCC as faculty member of the year. In early 2014, he was awarded the League for Innovation John & Suanne Roueche Teaching Excellence Award. In 2015, he was awarded an Honorary degree from the University of West London's, (England) London College of Music for his contributions to jazz education both in North America and in the United Kingdom. Additional accolades include Alumnus of the Year at both of the universities that he attended. University of Mary in 1995 and in 2017 the University of Missouri-Kansas City Conservatory of Music and Dance Also in 2017 The Kansas City Jazz Alliance formed by Mair and his wife received Jazz Distinction recognition in a concert celebration at the Johnny Pacheco Latin Music and Jazz Festival at Lehman College (SUNY) in the Bronx, New York. In 2021, the annual 4 day Kansas City Jazz Summit was selected as "Best of Kansas City" for local businesses and in 2022 the readers of JAM magazine voted Jim, Kansas City's Favorite Saxophonist.
Mair serves on the advisory board for the Metheny Music Foundation and the Burnett Family Foundation.

Jim has on multiple occasions performed as a soloist the Star Spangled Banner and Oh Canada at college and professional sporting events including for the Kansas City Chiefs, Kansas City Royals and Kansas City Monarchs home games.

Jim and Mary are the parents of Mandy and Jameson Mair.

Discography

As leader
 8th & Central (1991)
 Hip Soul (1995)
 Live on the Plaza (1995)
 Here's to the People (2003)
 Christmastime (2004)
 College of Southern Idaho "Live at Montreux" (1998)
 The Kansas City Jazz Orchestra "Take One" (2006)
 The Kansas City Jazz Orchestra "Live on the Plaza" (2008)

As sideman
 Lisa Henry: Straight No Chaser (1991)
 Tim Whitmer: Humorous Intentions (1992)
 Concepts Jazz: Chad's Dad (drum set) (1997)
 Tim Whitmer: Kansas City Standard Time (2002)
 Najee (2011)
 Roberto Magris: Morgan Rewind: A Tribute to Lee Morgan Vol. 2 (JMood, 2013)
 Roberto Magris: Cannonball Funk'n Friends (JMood, 2011)
 Roberto Magris: High Quote (JMood, 2016)

Bibliography

 DOWN BEAT auditions section June 1986
 JAM magazine cover story December 1991
 SAXOPHONE JOURNAL reviewer of new recordings 1992-1999
 SAXOPHONE JOURNAL cover story January/February 1997
 SAXOPHONE JOURNAL cover story November/December 2000
 JAM magazine cover story April 2004
 Kansas City ART Magazine cover story May 2004
 SPACES - KANSAS CITY a profile of the Kansas City Jazz Orchestra February 2008

Awards
 1984 Winning High School Combo (leader/performer)- Gold Winner Canadian National Finals, Toronto, ON
 1984 Lead Tenor Canadian High School All Star Jazz Ensemble
 1986 Down Beat Magazine Auditions section June edition - young talent deserving wider recognition
 1989 Full Fellowship recipient Aspen Music Festival
 1990 Full Fellowship recipient Aspen Music Festival
 1991 Winner Best Saxophonist JAM magazine readers poll
 1995 Alumnus of the Year, University of Mary, Bismarck, North Dakota
 1998 Person of the Year, Twin Falls Idaho Chamber of Commerce
 1999 Idaho Governor's Award for the Arts recognition
 2002 Who's Who of American Teachers 
 2010 Kansas Governor's Award for the Arts recognition
 2013 Faculty of the Year, Henry Louis Award for Teaching Excellence at Kansas City Kansas Community College
 2014 Teaching Excellence Award, League for Innovation - John & Suanne Roueche Foundation
 2015 Honorary Degree from the London College of Music, University of West London, England
 2017 Alumnus of the Year, University of Missouri-Kansas City Conservatory of Music and Dance
 2017 Jazz Distinction, The Kansas City Jazz Alliance, Johnny Pacheco Latin Jazz Festival, Lehman College, Bronx, New York
 2021 Best of Kansas City - non-profit local business, Kansas City Jazz Summit
 2022 Favorite Saxophonist by the readers of JAM magazine alongside world renowned Kansas City saxophonist Bobby Watson

References

External links 

 www.kansascityjazz.org

1966 births
Living people
Musicians from Winnipeg
Canadian jazz composers
Male jazz composers